The 2014 Munster Senior Football Championship was that year's installment of the annual Munster Senior Football Championship held under the auspices of Munster GAA. It was one of the four provincial competitions of the 2014 All-Ireland Senior Football Championship. Kerry entered the competition as defending Munster champions.

In September 2013, it was announced that the Munster Championship would become a seeded competition for 2014. This allowed footballing powerhouses Cork and Kerry to avoid each other until the final - where they duly met, Kerry emerging victorious and proceeding to an All-Ireland Final against Donegal. The decision to ease Cork and Kerry's passage through the Championship was overturned ahead of the 2015 competition after footballing minnows Clare, Limerick, Tipperary and Waterford (all four traditionally more successful at the ancient field sport of hurling) ganged together and gathered in a hotel on Tipperary soil to hammer out a format more suitable for their own needs.

The draw for the 2014 competition was made on 3 October 2013.

Teams
The Munster championship is contested by all six counties in the Irish province of Munster.

Bracket

Fixtures

Quarter-finals

Semi-finals

Final

See also
 Fixtures and results
 2014 All-Ireland Senior Football Championship
 2014 Connacht Senior Football Championship
 2014 Leinster Senior Football Championship
 2014 Ulster Senior Football Championship

Notes

References

External links
 Munster GAA website

2M
Munster Senior Football Championship